Athyma punctata is a  butterfly found in the Palearctic that belongs to the browns 
family. It is endemic to China (West China and Tibet).

Description from Seitz

P. punctata Leech (59c) differs in facies entirely from the other species of the genus, bearing above on a
black ground whitish violet spots, which recall Hypolimnas misippus as in the case of Limenitis albomaculata.
The underside is brownish, markings similar as above, but broader, and the discal spot of the hindwing is
enlarged to a broad band. The female (61c) is essentially different, the brownish markings on a dark ground more
bearing the general character of the genus. — Central China: Chang-Yang; West China: Ta-tsien-lu, Moupin.

References

Limenitidinae
Butterflies described in 1890